Timber Creek Township is a township in Marshall County, Iowa, USA.

History
Timber Creek Township was created in 1861.

References

Townships in Marshall County, Iowa
Townships in Iowa
1861 establishments in Iowa